Impendle Local Municipality is an administrative area in the UMgungundlovu District of KwaZulu-Natal in South Africa.

During the 18th century, the Griquas ("Abatwas") used to hide in the mountain in the area because they were accused of stealing livestock from the farmers who decided to fight them in order to protect their livestock. The Griquas used war spears, and this conflict was called "an outside war", i.e. Impiyasendle or Impiendle.

Impendle area is extremely diverse in its topography, climate and soils, and has a rich and complex natural environment. High-density settlements occur around Impendle, in villages such as Gomane, KwaNovuka, Similobha and Kamensi.

Main places
The 2001 census divided the municipality into the following main places:

Politics 

The municipal council consists of ten members elected by mixed-member proportional representation. Five councillors are elected by first-past-the-post voting in five wards, while the remaining five are chosen from party lists so that the total number of party representatives is proportional to the number of votes received. 

In the election of 1 November 2021 the African National Congress (ANC) won a majority of six seats on the council.

The following table shows the results of the 2021 election.

References

External links
 https://web.archive.org/web/20120330155717/http://impendle.local.gov.za/

Local municipalities of the Umgungundlovu District Municipality